Garcia Live Volume 17 is a three-CD live album by the Jerry Garcia Band.  It was recorded in November 1976 at several venues in northern California.  It was released on November 12, 2021.

The album features the January 1976 to August 1977 lineup of the Jerry Garcia Band, with Jerry Garcia on guitar and vocals, Keith Godchaux on keyboards, Donna Jean Godchaux on vocals, John Kahn on bass, and Ron Tutt on drums.

Critical reception 
In Relix Larson Sutton wrote, "Even though the 17th installment of the GarciaLive series breaks a bit from most of the others in the terrific ongoing chain of archival sets – as it is a compilation of cuts from several shows rather than a singular, complete performance – its chosen tracks and sequencing approximate well a Jerry Garcia Band '76 concert.  And with the standout version of "Mighty High" closing the three-disc volume, it is one not to be missed."

In Glide Magazine Doug Collette said, "Jerry Garcia must've been happy to just play music come fall of 1976. At least that would seem to be the case, judging from the seeming inexhaustible string of ideas he issues forth with his guitar (plus his strong, pliant vocals) during the approximately two and half hours of music on GarciaLive Volume 17."

Track listing 
Disc 1
"Sugaree" (Jerry Garcia, Robert Hunter) – 13:47 
"They Love Each Other" (Garcia, Hunter) – 8:40 
"Catfish John" (Bob McDill, Allen Reynolds) – 12:10  
"Midnight Moonlight" (Peter Rowan) – 9:46 
Disc 2
"How Sweet It Is (To Be Loved by You)" (Brian Holland, Lamont Dozier, Eddie Holland) – 9:42 
"Friend of the Devil" (Garcia, John Dawson, Hunter) – 9:55 
"Russian Lullaby" (Irving Berlin) – 12:30 
"Tore Up Over You" (Hank Ballard) – 13:08 
"I'll Take a Melody" (Allen Toussaint) – 15:03 
Disc 3
"After Midnight" (J. J. Cale) – 12:25 
"Stir It Up" (Bob Marley) – 9:20 
"Mystery Train" (Junior Parker, Sam Phillips) – 9:46 
"The Way You Do the Things You Do" (Smokey Robinson, Bobby Rogers) – 8:08 
"Mighty High" (David Crawford, Richard Downing) – 8:42 
Recording dates
 November 7, 1976 – Keystone, Berkeley, California
 November 12, 1976 – Freeborn Hall, University of California, Davis, Davis, California
 November 13, 1976 – East Gym, Humboldt State University, Arcata, California 
 1976, date and location unknown

Personnel 
Jerry Garcia Band
Jerry Garcia – guitar, vocals
Donna Jean Godchaux – backing vocals
Keith Godchaux – keyboards
John Kahn – bass
Ron Tutt – drums
Production
Produced by Marc Allan and Kevin Monty
Recording: Betty Cantor-Jackson
Mastering: Fred Kevorkian
Design, illustration: Lawrence Azerrad
Liner notes essay: Steve Parrish
Photos: Richard Loren, Ed Perlstein
Front cover artwork: Jerry Garcia

References 

Jerry Garcia Band live albums
2021 live albums
ATO Records live albums